Bún mắm is a fermented thick Vietnamese vermicelli soup sometimes called "Vietnamese gumbo."

Etymology 
Food reviewer Mike Sula explains, "Bun refers to the steamed rice vermicelli, which can be a bit mushy. But the key to this soup is the mam, as in mam ca loc (fermented fish paste) or mam tom (fermented shrimp paste), a murky purple slurry that on its own is one of the most odoriferous substances this side of a tannery fire. But added judiciously to soups or stir-fries it provides the elusive element of deep rounded flavor that puts the mam in umami."

In the United States 
Food critic Mike Sula described the bún mắm in a restaurant, Nha Hang Viet Nam, in Chicago's West Argyle Street Historic District (also known as Little Vietnam): "[I] recommend you fill your soup requirement with the bun mam, a.k.a. Vietnamese gumbo, a sour seafood soup not unlike Thai tom yam that originated in the Mekong Delta. It may not best the bowl you'd cool down with in the sweltering damp of Saigon's Ben Thanh market—that one incorporates pork too—but it's a solid one, brimming with eggplant, shrimp, squid, and silky, thinly sliced fish, accompanied by a heaping side of bean sprouts, cilantro, mint, and jalapeños."

A restaurant reviewer in the Boston area praised its delivery at the "Hien Vuong - a needle of a restaurant in a haystack of Vietnamese restaurants that makes up Fields Corner, Dorchester." The critic described this "rarely-found noodle soup whose heady broth is made of pickled/fermented anchovy" as "a huge bowl of murky opaque broth [filled] with thin vermicelli noodles, coarse chunks of skin-on salmon steak, shrimp, and squid. A side of the standard Pho embellishments, e.g., sprouts, basil leaves, etc., was presented. Best ways to describe it: Rich, smelly, salty, heady, tangy, sweet & sour, spicy and pungent. Umami-city."

After describing the difficulty of finding bún mắm in the San Francisco Bay Area, food critic Tim Costner praised a restaurant in Oakland, California: "The front-runner for the Bay Area's best bun mam is probably Bun Mam Soc Trang in Oakland, which really captures the spoils of the Mekong Delta (where the Vietnamese city of Soc Trang is located). The bun mam at BMST features tender shrimp, earthy catfish, crispy pork, steamed pork belly, and of course, vermicelli noodles. If you've never tasted bun mam, the word "fermented-fish" might still be rolling around in your head. And what about this broth? Well, at BMST, the bun mam broth isn't nearly as pungent as, say, fish sauce. In fact, it's subtle in its complexity and delicate in its flavor. And it will make you forget about all but the very best pho."

References

Vietnamese soups
Shrimp dishes
Seafood dishes
Vietnamese words and phrases
Noodle soups
Vietnamese noodle dishes